This article lists diplomatic missions resident in Ukraine. At present, the capital city of Kyiv hosts 80 embassies. Several other countries have non-resident embassies accredited from other regional capitals, such as Berlin, Poznań and Warsaw.

This listing excludes honorary consulates.

Diplomatic missions in Kyiv

Diplomatic missions in other cities

Berehove
 (Consulate)

Chernivtsi
 (Consulate General)

Donetsk
 (Consulate)

Kharkiv
 (Consulate General)

Lutsk
 (Consulate General)

Lviv
 (Embassy)
 (Consulate)
 (Consulate General)
 (Consulate General)

Mariupol
 (Consulate General)

Odesa 

 (Consulate-General)
 (Consulate-General)
 (Consulate-General)
 (Consulate)
 (Consulate-General)
 (Consulate)
 (Consulate-General)
 (Consulate-General)
 (Consulate-General)

Solotvyno
 (Consulate)

Uzhhorod
 (Consulate General)
 (Consulate General)

Vinnytsia
 (Consulate General)

Non-resident embassies accredited to Ukraine

Resident in Berlin, Germany

Resident in Moscow, Russia

Resident in Warsaw, Poland

Resident elsewhere 

 (Budapest)
 (Stockholm)
 (Geneva)
 (Geneva)
 (Bern)
 (Prague)
 (Valletta)
 (Vienna)
 (Rome)
 (Stockholm)

Closed Embassies and missions

Temporarily closed or relocated embassies due to the 2022 Russian invasion of Ukraine
, Embassy of Algeria, Kyiv

 (Operating from Vilnius, Lithuania) 
 (Operating from Warsaw, Poland)

Closed missions

References

External links 
 Foreign missions in Ukraine
 Map of embassies in Ukraine

See also 
 Foreign relations of Ukraine
 List of diplomatic missions of Ukraine

 
Diplomatic
Ukraine